Koshkino is a rural locality (a village) in Pertsevskoye Rural Settlement, Gryazovetsky District, Vologda Oblast, Russia. The population was 11 as of 2002.

Geography 
Koshkino is located 34 km northeast of Gryazovets (the district's administrative centre) by road. Blazny is the nearest rural locality.

References 

Rural localities in Gryazovetsky District